Noble Tit Bud de Budfalva (24 December 1846  19 August 1917) was an Imperial Austrian-born Romanian Greek Catholic priest, author, folklorist, translator, historian, aristocrat, vicar of Maramureș, director of the Boarding school of Sighet, vice-president of the "Association for the culture of the Romanian people from Maramureș" and president of the "Organization of Romanian teachers from Maramureș". He spoke seven languages.

Works
Ritual pentru pruncii şcolari din şcoalele elementare poporale (Ritual for school children in popular elementary schools), Szamosújvár, Editura tipografiei diecezane, 1910, 
Date istorice despre protopopiatele, parohiile mănăstirile române din Maramureș din timpurile vechi până în anul 1911 (Historical data about the archdioceses, parishes, Romanian monasteries in Maramureș from ancient times until 1911), Gherla, Ed. Cu literile tipografiei diecezane, 1911, 
Tipic preoţesc din cărţile rituale (Typical priesthood from ritual books), Tipografia "Aurora" A. Todoran, Gherla, 1894, 
Viaţa sânţilor (The life of the saints), Gherla, Tipografia Diecesană, 1897, 
Tipic bisericesc din cărţile rituali şi manuale de acest soiu (Typical church from ritual books and textbooks of this kind), Gherla, Cu literile tipografiei diecezane, 1906, 
Insămnări şi date despre înfiinţarea parochiei gr.-cat. române din Sigetul Maramureşului (Máramarossziget) (Inseminations and data about the establishment of the parish gr.-cat. Romanians from the Siget of Maramures), Gherla, ed. cu literele Tipografiei Diecesane, 1905, 
Catechese pentru pruncii scolari din scolele elementare poporale (Catechesis for school children in public elementary schools), Gherla, 1977, 
Poezii populare din Maramureș (Popular poems from Maramureș), Bucharest 1908, 86 p. (Published by the Romanian Academy), 
Concordantia biblica reale seu Locuri scripturali in ordinea alfabetica a materieloru diverse (Real biblical concordance or Scriptural places in the alphabetical order of various subjects), Gherla, 1876, 
Cuventari funebrale şi iertaţiuni din auctori renumiţi şi din scriptele [lui] Georgiu Molnaru (Funeral speeches and pardons from famous authors and from the scripts of Georgiu Molnaru), Gherla, 1878, 
Asociaţiunea pentru cultura poporului romîn din Maramureş: istoric, realizări (Association for the culture of the Romanian people from Maramureş: history, achievements), Transilvania, 1902,  
Disertaţiune despre episcopii şi vicarii români din Maramureş (Dissertation about the Romanian bishops and vicars of Maramureş), Tipografia Diecezană, Gherla, 1891. 
Doine şi hore poporale din Maramureş (Doine and folk choirs from Maramureş), 1872,
Viaţa Preacuratei Vergure Maria (The life of the Blessed Virgin Mary), Gherla, 1879, 1886, 1897
Translations:
De unde nu este rentorcere: roman de Adrien Gabrielly (Where there is no return: novel by Adrien Gabrielly), Pesta, 1872  
Translations from A. Daudet

Family
He was a member of the Bud de Budfalva noble family, a cadet branch of the House of Both. He was the brother of Noble János Bud de Budfalva, Minister of Finance (1924–1928), Minister of Food, Minister of Economy of the Kingdom of Hungary and cousin of Lady Irina Bud de Budfalva (1901–1980), landowner and philanthropist from Oaș Country, wife of Baron Vasile Mihalca de Dolha and Petrova.

References

Mircea Păcurariu, Dicționarul teologilor români (The Dictionary of Romanian Theologians), 
Bud, Tit (1911). Date istorice despre protopopiatele, parochiile și mănăstirile române din Maramureș din timpurile vechi până în anul 1911. Gherla.
Marina, Mihai (1998). Maramureșeni, portrete și medalioane. Cluj: Editura Dragoș Vodă, 178–185. .
Câmpeanu Marius Constantin, doctorate thesis VICARIATUL GRECO-CATOLIC AL MARAMUREŞULUI ÎNTRE ANII 1856 ŞI 1930, Scientific leader PhD Simion Retegan, Cluj–Napoca, 2015 (Legal deposit at National Library of Romania: quota V 110690, Barcod DL-BN/2018/83195)

1846 births
1917 deaths
People from Maramureș County
Hungarian nobility in Transylvania
Romanian Austro-Hungarians
Romanian Greek-Catholic priests
Romanian folklorists
20th-century Romanian historians
Romanian theologians
Romanian translators
Historians of the Catholic Church
19th-century Romanian historians